Ambavia is a genus of flowering plants belonging to the family Annonaceae.

Its native range is Madagascar.

Species:

Ambavia capuronii 
Ambavia gerrardi

References

Annonaceae
Annonaceae genera